Héctor Julio Páride Bernabó (7 February 1911 – 2 October 1997) was an Argentine-Brazilian artist, researcher, writer, historian and journalist. His nickname and artistic name, Carybé, a type of piranha, comes from his time in the scouts. He died of heart failure after the meeting of a candomblé community's lay board of directors, the Cruz Santa Opô Afonjá Society, of which he was a member.

He produced thousands of works, including paintings, drawings, sculptures and sketches. He was an Obá de Xangô, an honorary position at Ilê Axé Opô Afonjá.

Orixá Panels in the Afro-Brazilian Museum in Salvador 
Some of Carybé's work can be found in the Afro-Brazilian Museum in Salvador: 27 cedar panels representing different orixás or divinities of the Afro-Brazilian religion candomblé. Each panel shows a divinity with their associated implements and animal. The work was commissioned by the former Banco da Bahia S.A., now Banco BBM S.A., which originally installed them in its branch on Avenida Sete de Setembro in 1968.

Murals at Miami International Airport

American Airlines, Odebrecht and the Miami-Dade Aviation Department partnered to install  two of Carybé's murals in Miami International Airport. They had been on display in the American Airlines terminal at John F. Kennedy International Airport in New York since 1960. The 16.5 x 53-foot murals were commissioned when Carybé was awarded first and second prize in a contest to create public art pieces for JFK airport.

As its terminal at that airport was due for demolition, American Airlines donated the murals to Miami-Dade County,and Odebrecht invested in a project to remove, restore, transport and install the murals at Miami International Airport. 

The mural "Rejoicing and Festival of the Americas" portrays colorful scenes from popular festivals throughout the Americas, and "Discovery and Settlement of the West" depicts the pioneers’ journey into the American West.

Timeline

 1911 — Born
 1919 — Moves to Brazil.
 1921 — Given the name Carybé by the Clube do Flamengo scouts group, in Rio de Janeiro.
 1925 — He begins his artistic activities going to the pottery workshop of his elder brother, Arnaldo Bernabó, in Rio de Janeiro.
 1927–1929 — Studies at the National School of Fine Arts, in Rio de Janeiro.
 1930 — Works for the newspaper Noticias Gráficas, in Buenos Aires, Argentina.
 1935–1936 —  Works with the writer Julio Cortázar and as a draughtsman for the El Diário newspaper.
 1938 — Sent to Salvador by the Prégon newspaper.
 1939 — First collective exhibition, with the artist Clemente Moreau, at the Buenos Aires City Museum of Fine Arts, Argentina; illustrates the book Macumba, Relatos de la Tierra Verde, by Bernardo Kardon, published by Tiempo Nuestro.
 1940 — Illustrates the book Macunaíma, by Mário de Andrade.
 1941 — Draws the Esso Almanac, the payment for which allows him to make a long journey to Uruguay, Brazil, Bolivia, and Argentina.
 1941–1942 — Study trip around several South American countries.
 1942 — Illustration for the book La Carreta by Henrique Amorim, published by El Ateneo (Buenos Aires, Argentina).
 1943 — Together with Raul Brié, translates the book Macunaíma, by Mário de Andrade, into Spanish; produces the illustrations for the works Maracatu, Motivos Típicos y Carnavalescos, by Newton Freitas, published by Pigmaleon, Luna Muerta, by Manoel Castilla, published by Schapire, and Amores de Juventud, by Casanova Callabero; also publishes and illustrates Me voy al Norte, for the quarterly magazine Libertad Creadora; awarded First Prize by the Cámara Argentina del Libro (Argentine Book Council) for the illustration of the book Juvenília, by Miguel Cané (Buenos Aires, Argentina).
 1944 — Illustrates the books The Complete Poetry of Walt Whitmann and A Cabana do Pai Tomás, both published by Schapire and Los Quatro Gigantes del Alma by Mira y Lopez, Salvador BA; attends capoeira classes, visits candomblé meetings and makes drawings and paintings.
 1945 — Does the illustrations for Daniel Defoe's Robinson Crusoe, for the Viau publishing house.
 1946 — Helps in setting up the Tribuna da Imprensa newspaper, in Rio de Janeiro.
 1947 — Works for the O Diário Carioca newspaper, in Rio de Janeiro.
 1948 — Produces texts and illustrations for the book Ajtuss, Ediciones Botella al Mar (Buenos Aires, Argentina).
 1949–1950 — Invited by Carlos Lacerda to work at the Tribuna da Imprensa, in Rio de Janeiro.
 1950 — Invited by the Education Secretary Anísio Teixeira, moves to Bahia, and produces two panels for the Carneiro Ribeiro Education Center (Park School), in Salvador, Bahia.
 1950–1997 — Settles in Salvador, Bahia.
 1950–1960 — Actively participate in the plastic arts renewal movement, alongside Mário Cravo Júnior, Genaro de Carvalho, and Jenner Augusto.
 1951 — Produces texts and illustrations for the works of the Coleção Recôncavo, published by Tipografia Beneditina and illustrations for the book, Bahia, Imagens da Terra e do Povo, by Odorico Tavares, published by José Olímpio in Rio de Janeiro; for the latter work he receives the gold medal at the 1st Biennial of Books and Graphic Arts.
 1952 — Makes roughly 1,600 drawings for the scenes of the movie O Cangaceiro, by Lima Barreto; also works as the art director and as an extra on the film (São Paulo, SP).
 1953 — Illustration for the book A Borboleta Amarela, by Rubem Braga, published by José Olímpio (Rio de Janeiro, RJ).
 1955 — Illustrates the work O Torso da Baiana, edited by the Modern Art Museum of Bahia.
 1957 — Produces etchings, with original designs, for the special edition of Mário de Andrade's Macunaíma, published by the Sociedade dos 100 Bibliófilos do Brasil.
 1958 — Makes an oil painting mural for the Petrobras Office in New York, USA; illustrates the book As Três Mulheres de Xangô, by Zora Seljan, published by Editora G. R. D. (Rio de Janeiro, RJ); Receives a scholarship grant in New York, USA.
 1959 — Takes part in the competition for the New York International Airport panels project, in New York, USA, winning first and second prizes.
 1961 — Illustrates the book Jubiabá, by Jorge Amado, published by Martins Fontes (São Paulo, SP).
 1963 — Awarded the title of Honorary Citizen of Salvador, Bahia.
 1965 — Illustrates A Muito Leal e Heróica Cidade de São Sebastião do Rio de Janeiro, published by Raymundo Castro Maya (Rio de Janeiro, RJ).
 1966 — With Jorge Amado, co-authors Bahia, Boa Terra Bahia, published by Image (Rio de Janeiro, RJ); writes and illustrates the book Olha o Boi, published by Cultrix (São Paulo, SP).
 1967 — Receives the Odorico Tavares Prize – Best Plastic Artist of 1967, in a competition ran by the state government to stimulate the development of plastic arts in Bahia; makes the Orixás Panels for the Banco da Bahia (currently at the UFBA Afro-Brazilian Museum) (Salvador, BA).
 1968 — Illustrates the books Carta de Pero Vaz de Caminha ao Rei Dom Manuel, published by Sabiá (Rio de Janeiro) and Capoeira Angolana, by Waldeloir Rego, published by Itapoã (Bahia).
 1969 — Produces the illustrations for the book Ninguém Escreve ao Coronel, by Gabriel Garcia Marquez, published by Sabiá (Rio de Janeiro, RJ).
 1970 — Illustrates the books O Enterro do Diabo and Os Funerais de Mamãe Grande, published by Sabiá (Rio de Janeiro, RJ), Agotimé her Legend, by Judith Gleason, published by Grossman Publishers (New York, USA).
 1971 — Illustrates the books One Hundred Years of Solitude, by Gabriel Garcia Marquez and A Casa Verde by Mario Vargas Llosa, both published by Sabiá (Rio de Janeiro, RJ); produces texts and illustrations for the book Candomblé da Bahia, published by Brunner (São Paulo, SP).
 1973 — Illustrations for Gabriel Garcia Marquez's A Incrível e Triste História de Cândida Erendira e sua Avó Desalmada (Rio de Janeiro, RJ); paints the mural for the Legislative Assembly and the panel for the Bahia State Secretary of the Treasury.
 1974 — Produces woodcuts for the book Visitações da Bahia, published by Onile.
 1976 — Illustrates the book O Gato Malhado e a Andorinha Sinhá: uma história de amor, by Jorge Amado (Salvador, BA); receives the title of Knight of the Order of Merit of Bahia.
 1977 — Certified with the Honor for Afro-Brazilian Cult Spiritual Merit, Xangô das Pedrinhas ao Obá de Xangô Carybé (Magé, RJ).
 1978 — Makes the concrete sculpture Oxóssi, in the Catacumba Park; illustrates the book A Morte e a Morte de Quincas Berro D´Água, by Jorge Amado, published by Edições Alumbramento (Rio de Janeiro, RJ).
 1979 — Produces woodcuts for the book Sete Lendas Africanas da Bahia, published by Onile.
 1980 — Designs the costumes and scenery for the ballet Quincas Berro D´Água, at the Teatro Municipal in Rio de Janeiro.
 1981 — Publication of the book Iconografia dos Deuses Africanos no Candomblé da Bahia (Ed. Raízes), following thirty years of research.
 1982 — Receives the title of Honorary Doctor of the Federal University of Bahia.
 1983 — Makes the panel for the Brazilian Embassy in Lagos, Nigeria.
 1984 — Receives the Jerônimo Monteiro Commendation – Level of Knight (Espírito Santo); receives the Castro Alves Medal of Merit, granted by the UFBA Academy of Arts and Letters; makes the bronze sculpture Homenagem à mulher baiana (Homage to the Bahian woman), at the Iguatemi Shopping Center (Salvador, BA).
 1985 — Designs the costumes and sets for the spectacle La Bohéme, at the Castro Alves Theater; illustrates the book Lendas Africanas dos Orixás, by Pierre Verger, published by Currupio.
 1992 — Illustrates the book O sumiço da santa: uma história de feitiçaria, by Jorge Amado (Rio de Janeiro, RJ).
 1995 — Illustration of the book O uso das plantas na sociedade iorubá, by Pierre Verger (São Paulo, SP).
 1996 — Making of the short film Capeta Carybé, by Agnaldo Siri Azevedo, adapted from the book O Capeta Carybé, by Jorge Amado, about the artist Carybé, who was born in Argentina and became the most Bahian of all Brazilians.
 1997 — Illustration of the book Poesias de Castro Alves.

Exhibitions
ммIndividual Exhibitions:
 1943 — Buenos Aires (Argentina) — First individual exhibition, at the Nordiska Gallery
 1944 — Salta (Argentina) — at the Consejo General de Educacion
 1945 — Salta (Argentina) —  Amigos del Arte, Buenos Aires (Argentina) — Motivos de América, at the Amauta Gallery, Rio de Janeiro RJ — individual exhibition at the IAB/RJ
 1947 — Salta (Argentina) — Agrupación Cultural Femenina
 1950 — Salvador BA — First individual exhibit in Bahia, at the Bar Anjo Azul; São Paulo SP — MASP.
 1952 — São Paulo SP — MAM/SP
 1954 — Salvador BA — Oxumaré Gallery
 1957 — New York (USA) — Bodley Gallery; Buenos Aires (Argentina) — Bonino Gallery * 1958 - New York (USA) — Bodley Gallery
 1962 — Salvador BA - MAM/BA
 1963 — Rio de Janeiro RJ — Bonino Gallery
 1965 — Rio de Janeiro RJ — Bonino Gallery
 1966 — São Paulo SP — Astrea Gallery
 1967 — Rio de Janeiro RJ — Santa Rosa Gallery
 1969 — London (England) — Varig Airlines
 1970 — Rio de Janeiro RJ — Galeria da Praça
 1971 — Rio de Janeiro RJ — MAM/RJ, São Paulo SP — A Galeria; Belo Horizonte MG, Brasília DF, Curitiba PR, Florianopolis SC, Porto Alegre RS, Rio de Janeiro RJ and São Paulo SP — The Orixás Panel (exhibition tour), at the Casa da Cultura in Belo Horizonte, MAM/DF, the Public Library of Paraná, the Legislative Assembly of Santa Catarina State, the Legislative Assembly of Rio Grande do Sul, MAM/RJ and MAM/SP
 1972 — The Orixás Panel in Fortaleza CE — at the Ceará Federal University Art Museum, and in Recife PE — at the Santa Isabel Theater
 1973 — São Paulo SP — A Galeria
 1976 — Salvador BA — at the Church of the Nossa Senhora do Carmo Convent
 1980 — São Paulo SP — A Galeria
 1981 — Lisbon (Portugal) — Cassino Estoril
 1982 — São Paulo SP — Renot Art Gallery, São Paulo SP — A Galeria
 1983 — New York (USA) — Iconografia dos Deuses Africanos no Candomblé da Bahia, The Caribbean Cultural Center
 1984 — Philadelphia (USA) — Art Institute of Philadelphia; Mexico — Museo Nacional de Las Culturas; São Paulo SP — Galeria de Arte André
 1986 — Lisbon (Portugal) — Cassino Estoril; Salvador BA — As Artes de Carybé, Núcleo de Artes Desenbanco
 1989 — Lisbon (Portugal) — Cassino Estoril; São Paulo SP — MASP
 1995 — São Paulo SP — Documenta Galeria de Arte, São Paulo SP — Casa das Artes Galeria, Campinas SP — Galeria Croqui, Curitiba PR — Galeria de Arte Fraletti e Rubbo, Belo Horizonte MG — Nuance Galeria de Arte, Foz do Iguaçu PR — Ita Galeria de Arte, Porto Alegre RS — Bublitz Decaedro Galeria de Artes, Cuiabá MT — Só Vi Arte Galeria, Goiânia GO — Época Galeria de Arte, São Paulo SP — Artebela Galeria Arte Molduras, Fortaleza CE — Galeria Casa D'Arte, Salvador BA — Oxum Casa de Arte

Collective Exhibitions:
 1939 — Buenos Aires (Argentina) — Carybé and Clemente Moreau Exhibition, at the Museo Municipal de Belas Artes
 1943 — Buenos Aires (Argentina) — 29th Salon de Acuarelistas y Grabadores — first prize
 1946 — Buenos Aires (Argentina) — Drawings by Argentine Artists, at the Kraft Gallery
 1948 — Washington (USA) — Artists of Argentina, at the Pan American Union Gallery
 1949 — Buenos Aires (Argentina) — Carybé and Gertrudis Chale, at the Viau Gallery; Salvador BA — Bahian Showroom of Fine Arts, at the Hotel Bahia
 1950 — Salvador BA — 2nd Bahian Showroom of Fine Arts; São Paulo SP — MAM/SP
 1951 — São Paulo SP — 1st São Paulo Art Biennial, Trianon Pavilion.
 1952 — Salvador BA — 3rd Bahian Showroom of Fine Arts, at Belvedere da Sé; São Paulo SP — MAM/SP
 1953 — Recife PE — Mario Cravo Júnior and Carybé, at the Santa Isabel Theater; São Paulo SP — 2nd São Paulo Art Biennial, at MAM/SP
 1954 — Salvador BA — 4th Bahian Showroom of Fine Arts, at the Hotel Bahia. — Bronze medal
 1955 — São Paulo SP — 3rd São Paulo Art Biennial, at MAM/SP — first prize for drawing
 1956 — Salvador BA — Modern Artists of Bahia, at the Oxumaré Gallery; Venice (Italy) — 28th Venice Biennial
 1957 — Rio de Janeiro RJ — 6th National Modern Art Show — exemption from the jury; São Paulo SP — Artists from Bahia, at the MAM/SP
 1958 — San Francisco (USA) — Works by Brazilian Artists, at the Fine Arts Museums of San Francisco, Washington and New York (USA) — Works by Brazilian Artists, at the Pan American Union and the MoMA
 1959 — Seattle (USA) — 30th International Exhibition, at the Seattle Art Museum; Salvador BA — Modern Artists of Bahia, at the Dentistry School.
 1961 — São Paulo SP — 6th São Paulo Art Biennial, at MAM/SP — special room
 1963 — Lagos (Nigeria) — Brazilian Contemporary Artists, at the Nigerian Museum; São Paulo SP — 7th São Paulo Art Biennial Bienal, at the Fundação Bienal
 1964 — Salvador BA — Christmas Exhibition, at the Galeria Querino
 1966 — Baghdad (Iraq) — collective exhibition sponsored by the Calouste Gulbenkian Foundation; Madrid (Spain) — Artists of Bahia, at the Hispanic Culture Institute; Rome (Italy) — Piero Cartona Palace; Salvador BA — 1st National Biennial of Plastic Arts (Bienal da Bahia) — special room; Salvador BA — Draughtsmen of Bahia, at the Convivium Gallery
 1967 — Salvador BA — Christmas Exhibition at the Panorama Art Gallery; São Paulo SP — Artists of Bahia, at the A Gallery
 1968 — São Paulo SP — Bahian Artists, at the A Gallery
 1969 — London (England) — Tryon Gallery; São Paulo SP — 1st Panorama of Current Brazilian Art at the MAM/SP; São Paulo SP — Carybé, Carlos Bastos and Mario Cravo Jr., at the Portal Art Gallery.
 1970 — Liverpool (England) — 12 Contemporary Brazilian Artists, at Liverpool University; Rio de Janeiro RJ — Painters from Bahia at the Marte 21 Gallery; Reopening Exhibition for the Panorama Art Gallery; Porto Alegre RS — São Paulo Modern Art Museum Collection, at the UFRGS Art School; São Paulo SP — Christmas Exhibition, at the Irlandini Gallery
 1971 — São Paulo SP — 11th São Paulo Art Biennial, at the Fundação Bienal — special room; São Paulo SP — 3rd Panorama of Current Brazilian Art, at MAM/SP
 1972 — São Paulo SP — Art/Brazil/Today: 50 years later, at the Galeria da Collectio; Recife PE —Bahian Art Today, at the Hotel Miramar; São Paulo SP - 50 Years of Modern Art in Brazil, at the A Gallery
 1973 — Salvador BA — 150 Years of Painting in Bahia, at MAM/BA; São Paulo SP — 12th São Paulo Art Biennial, at the Fundação Bienal — special room; Tokyo, Atami, Osaka (Japan), São Paulo SP, Rio de Janeiro RJ and Brasília DF — 1st Brazil-Japan Fine Arts Exhibition — gold medal; São Paulo SP — Carybé and Ramiro Bernabó, at the A Gallery; Belo Horizonte MG — Jorge Amado and the Artists of Teresa Batista Cansada de Guerra, at the Ami Art Gallery
 1974 — Salvador BA — Plastic Arts of Bahia; Salvador BA — Art Exhibition Room of the Bahia Engineering Club
 1975 — Rio de Janeiro RJ — Carybé and Aldemir Martins, at the Mini Gallery; Salvador BA —The Bahia Fair; Tokyo, Atami, Osaka (Japan), São Paulo SP, Rio de Janeiro RJ and Brasília DF —  2nd Brazil-Japan Fine Arts Exhibition
 1976 — São Paulo SP - Carybé and Preti, at the Grifo Art Gallery; São Paulo SP — Art Show, Grupo Financeiro BBI; Tokyo, Atami, Osaka (Japan), São Paulo SP, Rio de Janeiro RJ and Brasília DF — 3rd Brazil —Japan Fine Arts Exhibition
 1979 — São Paulo SP — 15th São Paulo Art Biennial, at the Fundação Bienal; Tokyo, Kyoto, Atami (Japan), Rio de Janeiro RJ and São Paulo SP — 4th Brazil-Japan Fine Arts Exhibition
 1980 — Dakar (Senegal) — Bahian Painters; São Paulo SP — Econtemporary Art Exhibition, at the Chapel Art Show; Lisbon (Portugal) — Bahia Week, at the Cassino Estoril; Fortaleza CE — 11 Artists from Bahia, at Ceará Federal University; Salvador BA – Engravings of the Antonio Celestino Collection, at the Carlos Costa Pinto Museum; Penápolis SP — 4th Northeastern Plastic Arts  Exhibition, at the Penápolis Arts Foundation — guest artist
 1981 — Nekai, Tokyo, Kyoto, Atami (Japan), Brasília DF, Rio de Janeiro RJ and São Paulo SP — 5th Brazil-Japan Fine Arts Exhibition
 1982 — Salvador BA — Brazilian Art of the Odorico Tavares Collection, at the Carlos Costa Pinto Museum; Brasília DF — Three Artists from Bahia, at the Centro Cultural Thomas Jefferson
 1983 — Salvador BA — Artistas Amigos do Bistrô do Luiz (Artist Friends of Luiz's Bistro)
 1984 — Salvador BA — Influência de Mãe Menininha do Gantois na Cultura Baiana (The influence of Mãe Menininha do Gantois on Brazilian Culture), at the Bahia Art Museum; Fortaleza CE — Artists from Bahia, at the Edson Queiroz University Foundation; Dakar (Senegal) — Artists from Bahia, at the National Gallery; Aracajú SE – Bahian Artists Collective, at the J. Inácio Art Gallery, São Paulo SP — Tradition and Rupture: The synthesis of art and Brazilian culture, at the Fundação Bienal
 1985 — San José (Costa Rica) — Bahian Art Collective, at Galeria 2.000; São Paulo SP - 100 Itaú Works, at MASP
 1986 —Brasília DF — Bahians in Brasília, at Casa da Manchete
 1986 — Curitiba PR – An Artist Gifts the city, at the Solar do Barão
 1986 — Salvador BA - 39 Drawings of the Recôncavo Collection, at the Bahia Art Museum
 1987 — Salvador BA – Twelve Brazilian Artists, at the Anarte Gallery
 1987 — São Paulo SP – 20th Contemporary Art Exhibition, at the Chapel Art Show
 1988 — Salvador BA – The illustrated works of Jorge Amado, at the Fundação Casa de Jorge Amado
 1988 — São Paulo SP - 15 Years of the Brazil-Japan Fine Arts Exhibition, at the Mokiti Okada Foundation
 1988 — São Paulo SP – Rhythms and Shapes: contemporary Brazilian art, at Sesc Pompéia
 1989 — Copenhagen (Denmark) – Rhythms and Shapes: contemporary Brazilian art, Charlottenborg Museum
 1992 — Santo André SP – Litho engraving: methods and concepts, at the Paço Municipal; Zurich (Switzerland) - Brasilien: Entdeckung und Selbstentdeckung, at the Kunsthaus Zürich
 1994 — São Paulo SP – Engraving: subtleties and mysteries, printing techniques, at the State Pinacoteca.
 1996 — São Paulo SP - Norfest 96: Visual Arts, at D&D Shopping
 1998 — São Paulo SP - Prints: the art of Brazilian engraving, at the Espaço Cultural Banespa-Paulista; São Paulo SP – Seascapes in Great São Paulo Collections, at the Espaço Cultural da Marinha
 1999 — Rio de Janeiro RJ – Mostra Rio Gravura. Modern Brazilian Engraving: the National Fine Arts Museum Collection.
 1999 — Salvador BA - 100 Plastic Artists from Bahia, at the Museu de Arte Sacra
 1999 — São Paulo SP – The Reconsecration of Art, at Sesc Pompéia
 1999 — São Paulo SP - Cotidiano/Arte. O Consumo – Paratodos (Everyday/Art. Consumption – Forall), at the Itaú Cultural Center
 1999 — São Paulo SP - Cotidiano/Arte. O Consumo – Metamorfose do Consumo (Everyday/Art. Consumption – Metamorphosis of Consumption), at the Itaú Cultural Center
 2000 — São Paulo SP - Brazil + 500 Exhibition of the Rediscovery, at the Fundação Bienal
 2001 — Rio de Janeiro RJ - Aquarela Brasileira, at the Centro Cultural Light
 2001 — São Paulo SP - 4 Decades, at the André Art Gallery
 2001 — São Paulo SP – Figures and Faces, at the A Gallery

Collections
 Banco Itaú Collection - São Paulo SP
 Modern Art Center of the Calouste Gulbenkian Foundation - Lisbon (Portugal)
 Raymundo de Castro Maya Foundation - Rio de Janeiro RJ
 MAM - Salvador BA
 MAM - São Paulo SP
 MoMA - New York (USA)
 Afro Brazilian Museum - Salvador BA
 The City Museum - Salvador BA
 National Contemporary Art Museum - Lisbon (Portugal)
 Bahia Art Museum - Salvador BA
 Casa da Manchete - Rio de Janeiro RJ
 Museum Rade - Reinbek (Germany)
 Núcleo de Artes do Desenbanco - Salvador BA
 Pinacoteca Ruben Berta - Porto Alegre RS

"Nureyev" Designs by Carybé

"Thanks to choreographers Gerry Maretski and Hector Zaraspe, I was able to watch Nureyev's rehearsals in Rio de Janeiro's Municipal Theater, April 1971.

The dancer was rehearsing Stravinsky's 'Apollon Musagéte'. Patiently meshing with the musicians, he repeated parts, argued with the orchestra leader and perfected his rhythms and movements. Then, he began all over again until music and movement coincided with mathematical precision in such perfect coordination that you could not tell whether a note signaled a step or whether it was Nureyev's body that struck the notes.

During those two days, I too worked exhaustively trying to catch the weightlessness and harmony of this man who seemed to fly. I made dozens of drawings which were assembled in an album as a tribute to Apollo's Muses. For if there was anything mythological about the performance, it was Nureyev himself shot into the air by the triggers of his feet and returned to earth with the lightness of a feather."

Tributes
In O Capeta Carybé, Jorge Amado tells numerous stories about his great friend Carybé, whose life is almost as rich as a fiction: survival adventures, marriage, wanderings from Buenos Aires, in his homeland, to Bahia. Throughout his works, the artist registered highly Brazilian scenes and settings, such as fishing villages, ballerinas, exits from the church and cowboys taking a break. His work took Bahia to the outside world. That is why Jorge Amado refers to Carybé as "a remarkable example in his art, who recreates the reality of the country and the popular life that he knew like very few others, for having lived it like no other."

1911 births
1997 deaths
People from Lanús
Naturalized citizens of Brazil
Argentine emigrants to Brazil
20th-century Argentine painters
Argentine male painters
20th-century Brazilian painters
20th-century Brazilian male artists
20th-century Argentine male artists